Cathrynn N. Brown is an American politician and a Republican member of the New Mexico House of Representatives representing District 55 since January 18, 2011.

Elections
2012 Brown was unopposed for both the June 5, 2012 Republican Primary, winning with 1,538 votes and the November 6, 2012 General election, winning with 8,853 votes after a challenger withdrew.
2008 To challenge District 55 incumbent Democratic Representative John Heaton, Autry Reese was unopposed for the June 8, 2008 Republican Primary; after Reese withdrew, Brown was included on the November 4, 2008 General election ballot but lost to Representative Heaton.
2010 Brown and Representative Heaton were both unopposed for both their June 1, 2010 primaries, setting up a rematch; Brown won the November 2, 2010 General election with 4,010 votes (52.2%) against Representative Heaton.

Political positions 
In January 2021, shortly before a mob of Trump supporters stormed the Capitol, Brown announced legislation to decertify Joe Biden's victory in New Mexico by removing the state's five electoral votes he won. In a statement, Brown made baseless claims of election fraud, alleging fraud occurred in New Mexico and in other states. She claimed the final vote tallies had been "manipulated" but offered no evidence.

References

External links
Official page at the New Mexico Legislature
Campaign site

Cathrynn Brown at Ballotpedia
Cathrynn N. Brown at the National Institute on Money in State Politics

Place of birth missing (living people)
Year of birth missing (living people)
Living people
Republican Party members of the New Mexico House of Representatives
New Mexico lawyers
People from Carlsbad, New Mexico
Women state legislators in New Mexico
21st-century American politicians
21st-century American women politicians